Alan Walter Drayton (born 1951), is a male former athlete who competed for England.

Athletics career
Drayton represented England and won a bronze medal in the decathlon, at the 1978 Commonwealth Games in Edmonton, Alberta, Canada.

He won the 1978 AAA National Championship title in the decathlon.

References

1951 births
English male athletes
Commonwealth Games medallists in athletics
Commonwealth Games bronze medallists for England
Athletes (track and field) at the 1978 Commonwealth Games
Living people
English decathletes
Medallists at the 1978 Commonwealth Games